Guinness is a surname of Irish origin. Guinness (drink) is also a famous Irish brand of beer. 

It may also refer to:

Businesses
 Guinness Brewery, Dublin, Ireland
 Guinness Mahon, a merchant bank
 Guinness Peat Aviation, an aircraft leasing company
 Guinness Peat Group, an investment holding company

People
 Guinness (surname)
 Guinness family, descendants of Arthur Guinness and his brother Samuel Guinness

Sports
 Guinness GAA, a former Gaelic Athletic Association club
 Guinness Premiership, a rugby union competition, sponsored by Guinness between 2005 and 2010

Other uses
 Guinness World Records, a reference book
 Guinness baronets, titles
 The Guinness Partnership, a housing association and charity

See also
 Guinness-on-Sea